White Light is the seventh studio album by the British electronic music duo Groove Armada, released on 18 October 2010 through Cooking Vinyl. It consists of alternative versions of songs from their previous album, Black Light, along with one new song entitled "1980".

Background
Groove Armada members Andy Cato and Tom Findlay reworked the songs for the Jersey Live music festival.  According to Findlay when talking about the album:

Track listing

Charts

References

2010 albums
Groove Armada albums